The JMEV Xiaoqilin is an electric city car produced by JMEV, a joint venture between Renault and Chinese manufacturer Jiangling, which produces and markets electric cars in China.

It has five doors and can accommodate four people. The dashboard is rudimentary, the console having buttons dedicated to the air conditioning and the audio system without a touch screen.

References

Cars of China
Production electric cars